Jeffrey Weeks may refer to:

 Jeffrey Weeks (sociologist) (born 1945), historian and sociologist
 Jeffrey Weeks (mathematician) (born 1956), American mathematician